Nicolet High School is a public secondary school located in Glendale, Wisconsin. It is the only school in the Nicolet Unified School District, which serves Glendale, Fox Point, Bayside, and River Hills. Primary schooling is administered by three feeder districts. The Nicolet Unified School district is one of the few school districts in Wisconsin to be made up of only one school. Its main feeder schools are Milwaukee Jewish Day School, Glen Hills Middle School, Maple Dale Middle School, and Bayside Middle School.

Academics 
The school offers French, German, Hebrew, and Spanish languages.

Nicolet High School has an advanced placement program that includes calculus (AB and BC), statistics, computer science, physics (B, C: mechanics, and C: electromagnetism), chemistry, biology, environmental science, English language and composition, French language, Spanish language, Spanish literature, German language, music theory, American history, European history, macro-economics, micro-economics, studio art (drawing, 2D, 3D), and American government.

Nicolet offers Microsoft Certification. Students earn college credit for each application they become certified in. Certification are available in 365, Access, Excel, SharePoint, Word and more.

Nicolet High School was named a Blue Ribbon School by the Department of Education and was listed as one of the 50 best schools in Wisconsin by U.S. News & World Report in 2008.

Nicolet spends more money per student than other comparable high schools in Wisconsin.

Athletics

Winter
Boys' basketball
Girls basketball
Girls' gymnastics
Boys' ice hockey (co-op)
Girls' ice hockey (co-op)
Boys' swimming
Boys' skiing
Girls' skiing
Co-ed Winter Musical
Boys' wrestling
Boys' diving

Spring
Girls' softball
Girls' soccer
Girls' lacrosse (co-op)
Boys' lacrosse (co-op)
Boys' rugby – club sport
Boys' golf
Boys' tennis
Boys' track and field
Girls' track and field
Boys' baseball

Notable alumni 

 Michael Angeli – journalist, screenwriter
 Andrew Armacost – Brigadier General USAF Academy 
 Monte Davidoff – co-creator of Microsoft's first product, Altair BASIC
 Randee Drew – professional football player for the CFL Montreal Alouettes
 David Einhorn – hedge fund manager, founder and president of Greenlight Capital
 Howie Epstein –  musician, Tom Petty and the Heartbreakers
 Hal Erickson – media historian, author
 David Evans – professor of geology and geophysics at Yale University
 James Goldstein – "NBA Superfan"
 Dan Grunfeld – professional basketball player
 Justin Hurwitz – Oscar and Grammy award-winning composer and writer 
 Jalen Johnson – small forward for the Atlanta Hawks
 Kato Kaelin – actor and key witness in O.J. Simpson murder trial 
 Phil Katz – creator of PKZIP compression software
 Skip Kendall – professional golfer
 Michael Konik – author, television personality
 Mark Leno – American politician and first openly gay man to serve on the California State Senate
 AzMarie Livingston – fashion model
 Bari Lurie – politician
 Brian Lynch – Grammy Award-winning jazz musician
 Thomas L. Miller - film and television producer, co-founder of Miller-Boyett Productions
 Lance Painter – professional baseball pitcher
 Rick Perlstein – author and historian
 Jack Rieley – record producer, manager of The Beach Boys
 Sonya Robinson – musician and songwriter, 1983 Miss Black America
 Terilyn A. Shropshire – motion picture and television editor
 Tierney Sutton – jazz singer and five-time Grammy Award nominee
 Charlie Sykes – reporter at The Milwaukee Journal and talk radio host at WTMJ (AM)
 B.J. Tucker – professional football player for the San Francisco 49ers
 Joah Tucker – professional basketball player
 Mary Lou E. Van Dreel – Wisconsin State Representative
 Garrett Weber-Gale – Olympic two-time Olympic gold medalist, world record-holder in two events
 Oprah Winfrey – talk show host (attended her sophomore year; did not graduate)

References

External links
 Sports By Season/Level
 Co-curriculars & Clubs

Educational institutions established in 1955
Public high schools in Wisconsin
Glendale, Wisconsin
Schools in Milwaukee County, Wisconsin
1955 establishments in Wisconsin